Maria Georgatou (born 10 May 1984 in Athens) is a Greek rhythmic gymnast. She won a bronze medal at the 2000 Summer Olympics.

Personal
Maria Georgatou is from Corfu.

References 

Sports Reference

Living people
1984 births
Olympic gymnasts of Greece
Olympic bronze medalists for Greece
Gymnasts at the 2000 Summer Olympics
Olympic medalists in gymnastics
Greek rhythmic gymnasts
Gymnasts from Athens
Medalists at the 2000 Summer Olympics